Capital Regional Medical Center is a hospital in Tallahassee, Florida, United States. A fully accredited healthcare facility, it has more than 1,100 employees, approximately 500 physicians, and 266 beds. It includes a Bariatric Center, Comprehensive Breast Center, Cancer Center, Family Center, Accredited Chest Pain Center w/PCI, 24/7 Emergency Services in Leon & Gadsden Counties, Certified Primary Stroke Center, Surgical Services, Heart & Vascular Center, Wound Care Center, Seniors First and affiliated physician practices.

History 
The hospital opened in September 1979 as Capital Medical Center, owned by General Care Corporation. In September 1980, it was purchased by Hospital Corporation of America and became part of a multi-billion-dollar corporation. It was renamed HCA Tallahassee Community Hospital in January 1982. In 1982 and 1983, gained a CT Scan service and opened its family center.

In June 1985, Florida's Health and Rehabilitative Services granted TCH a Certificate of Need to expand and renovate, resulting in the 1986 opening of a cardiac catheterization lab, and the beginning of an $11 million expansion and renovation project. In 1988, HRS issued a final approval for TCH's renovated and expanded physical plant; and in April 1989, it issued final approval for TCH's open-heart surgical program.

From March 1990 through 1999, TCH began expanding services gaining an Intensive Care Unit,   hyperbaric oxygen chamber, mammography suite, Wound Treatment Center, and began off pump coronary artery bypass surgical treatments.

Updating and remodeling construction in 2002 was designed by the Driehaus Prize winner and New Classical architect Michael Graves in conjunction with Nashville architects Thomas, Miller, and Partners. In November 2012 the hospital announced that it would be expanded upwards going from a 6-story building to an 8-story building. The 2 floors were added and completed in February 2013.

In late August 2014, Capital Regional Medical Center announced the addition of behavioral health services through an adult psychiatric inpatient unit. Also in early fall 2014, Capital Regional Medical Center opened an expansive patient parking area giving patients more parking and easier access to the facility.

Services 
 Bariatric Center
 Cancer Center
 Comprehensive Breast Center
 ER - Main Campus
 ER - Gadsden Memorial
 Pediatric ER
 Senior Care ER
 Express ER
 Family Center
 Heart and Vascular Center
 Hyperbaric Oxygen Therapy
 Orthopedic Services
 Outpatient Services
 Physical Therapy and Rehabilitation Services
 Robotic Surgery
 Seniors First
 Wound Care

Women's Health
Capital Regional Medical Center (CRMC) provides a wide range of women's health services including heart disease resources and education with the HerHeart Program, OB/GYN and Urogynecology services through Capital Regional Women's Health, and American College of Radiology accredited Breast Center, and our Family Center.

Capital Regional Medical Center (CRMC) contains the only emergency hyperbaric operation between Jacksonville, Florida and Pensacola, Florida. CRMC also contractually handles military personnel from Moody Air Force Base in Valdosta, Georgia, Mayport Naval Station east of Jacksonville, and US Coastguard Sector Jacksonville. The helipad at CRMC is capable of simultaneous landing of the Eurocopter EC 135 based at CRMC as well as the SH-60 Seahawk or UH-60 Black Hawk.

Notes

Sources 
http://capitalregionalmedicalcenter.com
http://hcanorthflorida.com

External links 
Capital Regional Medical Center

Hospital buildings completed in 1979
Buildings and structures in Tallahassee, Florida
Hospitals in Florida
Michael Graves buildings
New Classical architecture